Morula (Habromorula) striata, common name the striate rock shell, is a species of small predatory sea snail, a marine gastropod mollusk in the family Muricidae, the murex snails or rock snails.

Description
The length of the shell varies between 10 mm and 20 mm.

Distribution
This marine species occurs in the Indo-West Pacific and off Japan.

References

 Houart R., Kilburn R.N. & Marais A.P. (2010) Muricidae. pp. 176–270, in: Marais A.P. & Seccombe A.D. (eds), Identification guide to the seashells of South Africa. Volume 1. Groenkloof: Centre for Molluscan Studies. 376 pp.

External links
 

striata
Gastropods described in 1868